Central is a Federal District Metro brazilian station on Orange and Green lines. It was opened on 31 March 2001 as the northern terminus of the inaugural section of the line, from Central to Terminal Samambaia and Praça do Relógio. The adjacent station is Galería.

References

Brasília Metro stations
2001 establishments in Brazil
Railway stations opened in 2001